Südavia (ICAO Code: VXY; IATA Code: FV; Callsign: Sudavia) was an airline based in Munich, Germany.

Company history
In 1984 a charter airline was founded in Munich under the name BN Rent-a-Plane.  The name was changed to Südavia Fluggesellschaft in 1984 with scheduled services between Munich and Saarbrücken using Beech 90 aircraft.  Further operations in 1984 included service to Verona, Italy.  In 1986 services to Pisa were begun and the fleet expanded to include the larger Beech 200.  At the end of 1987 the Dornier 228 was introduced and services to Strasbourg were begun.

In 1987 the Beech 1900 was introduced and since this was the first pressurized aircraft in the fleet, it was used for the Italian routes.  In February 1988, Südavia began to work closely with DLT and that led to the introduction of the Embraer EMB 120 Brasilia acquired from DLT. The rapid expansion of Südavia brought about financial problems and some routes were taken over by DLT.  It was during this time that DLT tried to take over Südavia but the deal failed and a group of investors was found that took over 44% of the company and with that capital the Brasilias were replaced by the Saab 340.  But by April 1990 the mounting debt and financial troubles led to the revocation of the license and operations were suspended.

References

External links
Airtimes timetables
Sudavia fleet information
Sudavia advertising

Defunct airlines of Germany
Airlines established in 1984
Airlines disestablished in 1990